Tomasz Marian Głogowski (born 30 December 1974 in Tarnowskie Góry) is a Polish politician. He was elected to the Sejm on 25 September 2005 getting 6812 votes in 29 Gliwice district, as a candidate from the Civic Platform list.

See also
Members of Polish Sejm 2005-2007

External links
Tomasz Głogowski - parliamentary page - includes declarations of interest, voting record, and transcripts of speeches.

Civic Platform politicians
1974 births
Living people
People from Tarnowskie Góry
Members of the Polish Sejm 2005–2007
Members of the Polish Sejm 2007–2011
Members of the Polish Sejm 2011–2015
Members of the Polish Sejm 2015–2019
Members of the Polish Sejm 2019–2023
University of Silesia in Katowice alumni